Derbyshire County Cricket Club in 1931 represents the cricket season when the English club Derbyshire had been playing for sixty years. It was their thirty-third season in the County Championship and they won seven matches to finish seventh.

1931 season

Derbyshire were fortunate in persuading A. W. Richardson to become captain in 1931. Building on the efforts of Guy Jackson and with the help of the coach, Sam Cadman, Richardson set about building the team that became a match-winning combination and took the championship in 1936.

Derbyshire played 28 games in the County Championship, and one match against the touring New Zealanders. Denis Smith was top scorer with two centuries. Veteran Archibald Slater, in his last season, took 106 wickets closely followed by Tommy Mitchell on 105.

The only new arrival in the Derbyshire side in 1931 was Alan Skinner who was to see many years service with the club.

Matches

{| class="wikitable" style="width:100%;"
|-
! style="background:#efefef;" colspan="6"| List of matches
|- style="background:#efefef;"
!No.
!Date
!V
!Result 
!Margin
!Notes

|
|- 
|1
|2 May 1931
| Leicestershire  County Ground, Derby 
| style="background:#fc0;"|Drawn
|
|    
|- 
|2
|6 May 1931
| Gloucestershire  The Victoria Ground, Cheltenham 
| style="background:#f00;"|Lost 
|4 wickets
|Parker 6–41 and 8–50    
|- 
|3
| 9 May 1931
|  SurreyKennington Oval 
| style="background:#fc0;"|Drawn
|
| A E Alderman 113; Fender 100   
|- 
|4
| 16 May 1931
| Kent  County Ground, Derby 
| style="background:#f00;"|Lost 
|9 wickets
| Freeman 5–63; AG Slater 8–63   
|- 
|5
| 20 May 1931
| Essex County Ground, Leyton 
| style="background:#fc0;"|Drawn
|
| D Smith 131; GM Lee 147   
|- 
|6
| 23 May 1931
| Warwickshire Edgbaston, Birmingham 
| style="background:#fc0;"|Drawn
|
| Croom 103; Paine 6–80   
|- 
|7
| 27 May 1931
|  Worcestershire County Ground, New Road, Worcester 
| style="background:#fc0;"|Drawn
|
|    
|- 
|8
| 30 May 1931
|  Sussex   Queen's Park, Chesterfield 
| style="background:#0f0;"|Won 
|Innings and 188 runs
| T. B. Mitchell 6–11 and 6–19   
|- 
|9
| 6 Jun 1931
|  Nottinghamshire Rutland Recreation Ground, Ilkeston 
| style="background:#fc0;"|Drawn
|
|L F Townsend 6–59    
|- 
|10
| 13 Jun 1931
|New Zealand  County Ground, Derby 
| style="background:#fc0;"|Drawn
|
|Not a County Championship matchT. B. Mitchell 5–97  
|- 
|11
| 17 Jun 1931
| EssexRutland Recreation Ground, Ilkeston 
| style="background:#fc0;"|Drawn
|
|AG Slater 8–51    
|- 
|12
| 20 Jun 1931
|Hampshire Queen's Park, Chesterfield 
| style="background:#0f0;"|Won 
|8 wickets
| D Smith 108; T. B. Mitchell 5–47    
|- 
|13
| 24 Jun 1931
| Glamorgan   Cardiff Arms Park 
| style="background:#fc0;"|Drawn
|
|    
|- 
|14
| 27 Jun 1931
|  WorcestershireCounty Ground, Derby 
| style="background:#0f0;"|Won 
|7 wickets
|Gibbons 109; Root 5–113; H Storer 5–32    
|- 
|15
| 1 Jul 1931
|  Surrey Queen's Park, Chesterfield 
| style="background:#fc0;"|Drawn
|
| T. B. Mitchell 6–157; Fender 6–102  
|- 
|16
| 4 Jul 1931
| Leicestershire  Bath Grounds, Ashby-de-la-Zouch 
| style="background:#fc0;"|Drawn
|
| AG Slater 5–28   
|- 
|17
| 8 Jul 1931
|  Sussex   County Ground, Hove 
| style="background:#f00;"|Lost 
|Innings and 14 runs
| Wensley 6–47 and 6–48; T S Worthington 5–80  
|- 
|18
| 11 Jul 1931
|Hampshire County Ground, Southampton 
| style="background:#0f0;"|Won 
|145 runs
| Baring 5–85; L F Townsend 6–23;    
|- 
|19
| 18 Jul 1931
| Gloucestershire Queen's Park, Chesterfield 
| style="background:#f00;"|Lost 
|18 runs
| T. B. Mitchell 6–79; Goddard 8–79; Parker 6–64   
|- 
|20
| 22 Jul 1931
| Northamptonshire  County Ground, Derby 
| style="background:#0f0;"|Won 
|6 wickets
| GM Lee 173; Timms 147; T. B. Mitchell 5–39   
|- 
|21
| 25 Jul 1931
| Middlesex Rutland Recreation Ground, Ilkeston 
| style="background:#fc0;"|Drawn
|
| Peebles 5–58; AG Slater 5–32   
|- 
|22
| 29 Jul 1931
|Lancashire  Park Road Ground, Buxton 
| style="background:#fc0;"|Drawn
|
| L F Townsend 6–49; Hopwood 5–52   
|- 
|23
| 1 Aug 1931
| Warwickshire  County Ground, Derby 
| style="background:#f00;"|Lost 
|9 wickets
| Partridge 5–47; Paine 5–67   
|- 
|24
| 5 Aug 1931
| Kent St Lawrence Ground, Canterbury 
| style="background:#fc0;"|Drawn
|
| L F Townsend 5–78; Freeman 5–77; Marriott 5–42    
|- 
|25
| 8 Aug 1931
|  Nottinghamshire Trent Bridge, Nottingham 
| style="background:#fc0;"|Drawn
|
|    
|- 
|26
| 15 Aug 1931
| Northamptonshire  County Ground, Northampton 
| style="background:#0f0;"|Won 
|Innings and 71 runs
| GM Lee 141; L F Townsend 8–45;   
|- 
|27
| 19 Aug 1931
| Middlesex Lord's Cricket Ground, St John's Wood 
|No play
|
|Match abandoned    
|- 
|28
| 22 Aug 1931
| Glamorgan   Queen's Park, Chesterfield 
| style="background:#0f0;"|Won 
|184 runs
| Ryan 7–105; AG Slater 5–27; Mercer 5–37;  
|- 
|29
| 26 Aug 1931
|Lancashire  Stanley Park, Blackpool 
| style="background:#f00;"|Lost 
|3 wickets
| AG Slater 5–22; Tyldesley 6–21   
|- 
|

Statistics

County Championship batting averages

County Championship bowling averages

Wicket-keeper

H Elliott Catches 43 Stumping 28

See also
Derbyshire County Cricket Club seasons
1931 English cricket season

References

1931 in English cricket
Derbyshire County Cricket Club seasons
English cricket seasons in the 20th century